Charles Kraft may refer to:

 Charles H. Kraft (born 1932), American anthropologist and Christian teacher
Charles Herbert Kraft (1843–1944), American businessman and one of the brothers who founded Kraft Cheese Company.
 Charles William Kraft Jr. (1903–2002), American judge

See also 
 Charles Wing Krafft (fl. 2013), American artist